Gabrielle Diana Gladu (born February 28, 1999), also known as Gabrielle Diana, is a Canadian transgender activist. She has been public about her transition and created the #MomentsInTransition hashtag on Twitter and Instagram.

Advocacy
Gladu has used her social media to promote recognition and visibility for the trans community, including by documenting aspects of her transition. In 2015, The Advocate named her one of "25 Trans Pioneers Who Took Us Past The Tipping Point." Gladu also contributed an essay to MTV News titled "What I Want You To Know During Transgender Awareness Week" that was published on November 20, 2015. 

At age 16, Gladu contributed two articles to the online magazine Queer Voices. Writing for ATTN:, author Kyle Fitzpatrick stated Gladu is a teen who embodies  America's "new queerness", even though she is international and not based in the United States.

In 2016, at age 17, Gladu was credited with the #MomentsInTransition hashtag trend on Twitter and Instagram after posting photos documenting her own transition. According to Cosmopolitan magazine, "it's grown into a really beautiful collection of pictures and celebration for transgender people." 

In March 2019, Gladu received public attention after a dispute on Twitter with singer/songwriter Azealia Banks. The dispute included public and DM messages between Gladu and Banks about the role of transgender and cis women in society. Banks claimed that cis women are being erased by trans women, which Gladu disputed. After the conflict, Out published commentary by Rose Dommu titled "Azealia Banks isn't a Queer Ally-- She is a Bully!"

Personal life

Early life and education
Gladu was raised in Ottawa, Ontario in an "extremely conservative community". In 2015, she left Catholicism and identified as a Buddhist. She attended a parochial school and then chose to attend a public school due to a concern about whether her transition would be as accommodated and welcomed.

Transition

Gladu has written on her social media that she "used to wear my mom’s dresses and makeup, and it wasn't easy in the beginning since I wasn't transitioning".

At the beginning of eighth grade, Gladu attempted suicide on December 12, 2012. Though Gladu was not yet out as trans, the suicide attempt was related to her gender identity and confusion surrounding her female identity that she had yet to explore. With regard to her suicide attempt, Gladu said, "I was very, very confused. I knew something was different about me. I was so afraid of what people would think of me." Cleis Abeni of The Advocate writes Gladu then received intensive therapy and "began to reorganize everything in her life around accepting her identity."

Galdu came out as trans during her freshman year in high school; The New York Times writes that "she asked everyone to call her Belle, a shortened version of Gabrielle, and to use female pronouns" and that she began "documenting her transition online in a series of popular YouTube videos." The New York Times also writes, "Support flowed in, giving her the courage to continue, and she began her medical transition the next year." 

On September 27, 2015, Gladu received the message that her name had been legally changed to Gabrielle Diana Gladu. Gladu uploaded a video to her Twitter, which was filmed by her cousin. Gladu's mother surprised her with a cake that revealed that her name was legally changed, which received attention from People magazine, MTV News, BuzzFeed, and NewNowNext. Cleis Abeni of The Advocate also noted the viral video, and commented, "In the lore of trans lives, public and government acceptance of personal choices for naming stands near the top of the proverbial affirmation pyramid." Buzzfeed quotes Gladu stating, "I hope when people see this video, they see the importance of names and pronouns, because they are so important to someone's transition" [...] "It makes them feel valued and important, and that makes transitioning a lot easier."

References

1999 births
Living people
Canadian activists
Canadian YouTubers
LGBT YouTubers
People from Ottawa
Transgender women
Canadian transgender people
20th-century Canadian LGBT people
21st-century Canadian LGBT people